Bolivar Airport may refer to:

 Bolivar Airport, serving Bolivar, Argentina (ICAO: SAZI)
 Bolivar Municipal Airport, serving Bolivar, Missouri, United States (FAA: M17)
 Puerto Bolívar Airport, serving Uribia, Colombia (ICAO: SKPB)
 William L. Whitehurst Field, an airport serving Bolivar, Tennessee, United States (FAA: M08)

See also
 Simón Bolívar International Airport (disambiguation)